The 1989 Athens Trophy was a women's tennis tournament played on outdoor clay courts in Athens, Greece that was part of the Category 1 tier of the 1989 WTA Tour. It was the fourth edition of the tournament and was held from 11 September through 17 September 1989. Cecilia Dahlman won the singles title.

Finals

Singles

 Cecilia Dahlman defeated  Rachel McQuillan 6–3, 1–6, 7–5
 It was Dahlman's only title of the year and the 1st of her career.

Doubles

 Sandra Cecchini /  Patricia Tarabini defeated  Silke Meier /  Elena Pampoulova 4–6, 6–4, 6–2
 It was Cecchini's 2nd title of the year and the 12th of her career. It was Tarabini's 2nd title of the year and the 2nd of her career.

See also
 1989 Athens Open – men's tournament

References

External links
 ITF tournament edition details
 Tournament draws

Athens Trophy
Athens Trophy
Athens Trophy